The UTC offset is the difference in hours and minutes between Coordinated Universal Time (UTC) and local solar time, at a particular place. So if the time being described is two hours ahead of UTC (such as in Kigali, Rwanda [approx. 30° E]), the UTC offset would be "+02:00", "+0200", or simply "+02".

By convention, every inhabited place in the world has a UTC offset that is a multiple of 15 minutes but the majority of offsets are stated in whole hours. There are many cases where the national standard time uses a time zone that differs from the UTC offset appropriate to its longitude.

Time zones and time offsets

A time zone is a geographical region in which residents observe the same standard time. Although nominally a new time zone is established every 15 degrees east or west of the prime meridian (meaning a one hour change in solar time), in practice local geographical or political considerations may vary its application. The most extreme example of this is time in China, which applies a single standard time offset of UTC+08:00 (eight hours ahead of Coordinated Universal Time), even though China spans five geographical time zones.

The UTC offset (or time offset) is an amount of time subtracted from or added to Coordinated Universal Time (UTC) time to specify the local solar time (which may not be the current civil time, whether it is standard time or daylight saving time).

Daylight saving time 

Several regions of the world use daylight saving time (DST) and the UTC offset during this season is typically obtained by adding one hour to local standard time. Central European Time UTC+01:00 is replaced by Central European Summer Time UTC+02:00, and Pacific Standard Time UTC−08:00 is replaced by Pacific Daylight Time UTC−07:00.

Notable examples

See also
ISO 8601 – international standard for representing dates and times.

External links
Time Service Dept., U.S. Naval Observatory